Year 1495 (MCDXCV) was a common year starting on Thursday (link will display the full calendar) of the Julian calendar.

Events 
<onlyinclude>

January–December 
 February – King's College, Aberdeen, predecessor of the University of Aberdeen in Scotland, is founded on the petition of William Elphinstone, Bishop of Aberdeen. It is the first English-speaking university to teach medicine.
 February 22 – Italian War of 1494–98: King Charles VIII of France enters Naples, to claim the city's throne. A few months later, he decides to return to France, and leaves Naples with most of his army, leaving a force under his cousin Gilbert, Count of Montpensier as viceroy. Syphilis is first definitely recorded in Europe during this invasion. (perhaps from French forces who may have contacted Croats fleeing an Ottoman army in the east).
 May 26 – A Spanish army under Gonzalo Fernández de Córdoba lands in Calabria, with the purpose of ousting the French and restoring Ferdinand II of Naples to the throne.
 June 1 – Brother John Cor of Lindores Abbey pays duty on 8 bolls of malt to the Exchequer in Scotland to make aqua vitae for King James IV; the record in the Exchequer Rolls is the first written reference to Scotch whisky. 
 June 28 – Battle of Seminara: Córdoba and Ferdinand are defeated by a French army under Bernard Stewart, Lord of Aubigny.
 July 3 – Battle of Deal: Perkin Warbeck's troops land in Kent, in support of his claim to the English crown, backed by Margaret of York, Duchess of Burgundy. They are routed before Warbeck himself can disembark, and he retreats to Ireland and then to Scotland.
 July 6 – Battle of Fornovo: The French army under King Charles secures its retreat from Italy, by defeating a combined Milanese-Venetian force under Giovanni Francesco Gonzaga, Marquis of Mantua.
 Summer – John, King of Denmark, sets sail for Kalmar, Sweden, to negotiate with Sten Sture the Elder to restore the power of the Kalmar Union. However, his flagship, Gribshunden, catches fire and sinks off the coast of Ronneby with loss of life, and he is forced to abandon the mission.
 October 25 – King Manuel I of Portugal begins his reign.
 November 30 – An explosion at Vyborg Castle deters the Russian forces, who have invaded Sweden through Karelia.

Date unknown 

 The oldest extant cable railway is probably the Reisszug, a private line providing goods access to Hohensalzburg Fortress at Salzburg in Austria. This line is generally described as the oldest funicular.
 Poynings' Law comes into effect, placing the Parliament of Ireland under the authority of the Parliament of England.
 The Reichskammergericht of the Holy Roman Empire is founded in Frankfurt.
 Henry VII of England commissions the world's first dry dock, at Portsmouth.
 Piero Pacini da Pescia publishes Epistles, Gospels, and Popular Readings in the Tuscan Language</onlyinclude>

 Births 
 January 26 – Emperor Go-Nara of Japan (d. 1557)
 February 4
 Francesco II Sforza, Duke of Milan (d. 1535)
 Jean Parisot de Valette, Grand Master of the Knights Hospitaller (d. 1568)
 February 13 – Giacomo Puteo, Spanish cardinal (d. 1563)
 March 6 – Luigi Alamanni, Italian poet and statesman (d. 1556)
 March 8 – John of God, Portuguese friar and saint (d. 1550)
 March 26 – Michele Antonio, Marquess of Saluzzo (d. 1528)
 March 29 – Leonhard Päminger, Austrian composer (d. 1567)
 April 16 – Petrus Apianus, German humanist (d. 1552)
 August 1 – Jan van Scorel, Dutch painter (d. 1562)
 August 24 – Otto I, Duke of Brunswick-Harburg, Prince of Lüneburg and Baron of Harburg (d. 1549)
 September 18 – Louis X, Duke of Bavaria, German noble (d. 1545)
 September 20 – Gian Matteo Giberti, Catholic bishop (d. 1543)
 September 23 – Bagrat III of Imereti, King of Imereti (d. 1565)
 September 24 – Barbara of Brandenburg-Ansbach-Kulmbach, Landgravine of Leuchtenberg (d. 1552)
 November 1 – Erhard Schnepf, German theologian (d. 1558)
 November 21 – John Bale, English churchman (d. 1563)
 December 5 – Nicolas Cleynaerts, Flemish grammarian (d. 1542)
 date unknown Robert Barnes, English reformer and martyr (d. 1540)
 Cuauhtémoc, 11th Tlatoani (emperor) of Tenochtitlan (modern Mexico City), 1520-1521 (d. 1525)
 Thomas Wharton, 1st Baron Wharton (d. 1568)
 probable''
 Pedro de Alvarado, Spanish conquistador (d. 1541)
 Marie Dentière, Genevan Protestant reformer and theologian (d. 1561)
 Costanzo Festa, Italian composer (d. 1545)
 Nicolas Gombert, Flemish composer (d. 1560)

Deaths 
 January 11 – Pedro González de Mendoza, Spanish cardinal and statesman (b. 1428)
 January 21 – Magdalena of France, French princess and regent of Navarre (b. 1443)
 February 25 – Sultan Cem, pretender to the Ottoman throne (b. 1459)
 May 31 – Cecily Neville, English duchess, mother of Edward IV of England and Richard III of England (b. 1415)
 September – Vlad Călugărul, Wallachian half-brother of Vlad III (The Impaler)
 September 14 – Elizabeth Tudor, English princess, daughter of Henry VII of England (b. 1492)
 October 25 – King John II of Portugal (b. 1455)
 October 30 – Francis, Count of Vendome (b. 1470)
 December 16 – Charles Orlando, Dauphin of France, French noble (b. 1492)
 December 18 – King Alphonso II of Naples (b. 1448)
 December 21 – Jasper Tudor, 1st Duke of Bedford (b. c. 1431)

References